Jackson Township is one of eleven townships in Camden County, Missouri, USA.  As of the 2000 census, its population was 663.

Jackson Township was established in 1841, and named after Andrew Jackson.

Geography
It contains one cemetery, Auglaize.

The streams of Coon Creek, Dry Auglaize Creek, Honey Run and Wet Glaize Creek run through this township.

References

 USGS Geographic Names Information System (GNIS)

External links
 US-Counties.com
 City-Data.com

Townships in Camden County, Missouri
Townships in Missouri